The Palacio de Galiana is a Mudéjar palace in Toledo, Spain, on the borders of the Tagus River. It was built on the site of an earlier summer villa  and garden of Al-Mamun, the king of the Taifa of Toledo, in the thirteenth century by king Alfonso X of Castile.

Gardens
The garden area around the palace, called the 'Al-Munya al-Na‘ura' (the Water Wheel Orchard) or 'Huerta del Rey' (the king's garden)  included a botanical garden of the pharmacologist Ibn al-Wafid. It was famous for its irrigation works, the ruins of which are still to be seen.

The garden was also, possibly, the location of a water clock, constructed by Al-Zarqali.

20th century
From the 1950s onwards the Palacio de Galiana was restored and its present garden designed by the architects Manuel Gómez Moreno and Fernando Chueca Goitía under the auspices of its owner Carmen Marañón.

See also
Generalife
Huerta de la Alcurnia
Spanish gardens

Notes

References
Martínez Caviró, B., Mudéjar Toledano. Palacios y Conventos, Madrid, 1980

External links
 Thorough report and extensive references on the early history of the palace, photos and map at the bottom, on Middle East Gardens.com  (retrieved on November 27, 2008)
Photos of the Palacio de Galiana on Oronoz.com  (retrieved on November 27, 2008)
In Spanish: Jésus Téllez Rubio, "Dos Agrónomos Toledanos: Ibn Wâfid e Ibn Bassâl, y la Huerta del Rey" in: Tulaytula: Revista de la Asociación de Amigos del Toledo Islámico, ISSN 1575-653X, Nº. 4, 1999, pags. 49-58 (click on 'descargar' PDF)  (retrieved on November 30, 2008)
Julián Ramos Ramos, "Las almunias de la ciudad de Toledo", in: Tulaytula: Revista de la Asociación de Amigos del Toledo Islámico, ISSN 1575-653X, Nº. 3, 1998, pags. 51-76  (click on 'descargar' PDF) 
Wikimapia  (retrieved on November 27, 2008)
 In Spanish, "La Historia de Fermosa" Abraham S. Marrache, Hebraica Ediciones 2009 https://web.archive.org/web/20130607013300/http://lahistoriadefermosa.com/ : Palacio de Galiana was the backdrop to the love affair that took place in 1179, between King Alfonso VIII of Castile and Fermosa, the young Jewess from Toledo.

Houses completed in the 13th century
Mudéjar architecture in Castilla–La Mancha
Gardens in Spain
 Galiana
Tourist attractions in Toledo, Spain